Uskuch (Üç-Kös) is a rural locality (a selo) and the administrative centre of Verkh-Pyankovskoye Rural Settlement of Choysky District, the Altai Republic, Russia. The population was 331 as of 2016. There are 6 streets.

Geography 
Uskuch is located east from Gorno-Altaysk, in the valley of the Isha River, 30 km east of Choya (the district's administrative centre) by road. Verkh-Biysk is the nearest rural locality.

References 

Rural localities in Choysky District